Ōrākei Basin is one of the volcanoes in the Auckland volcanic field in the North Island of New Zealand. It has an explosion crater around 700 m wide, with a surrounding tuff ring. The present basin is slightly larger than the original maar crater.

Geology

After eruption at least 83,000 years ago, it became a freshwater lake that had an overflow stream in the vicinity of present Ōrākei Rd bridge. As sea level rose after the end of the Last Ice Age, the lake, which by then had shallowed to a swamp, was breached by the sea and has been a tidal lagoon ever since. A tidal lagoon, it is popular for watersports.

History

A railway line (the North Island Main Trunk, branded as the Eastern Line for suburban services) runs through the north side of the basin. The railway runs along a causeway embankment which was constructed in the 1920s and created a barrier between the Ōrākei Basin and the rest of the Waitematā Harbour. This allows for the basin to be kept full, even during surrounding low tides. The embankment has control gates to allow the scheduled flushing and re-filling of water in the basin.

References

City of Volcanoes: A geology of Auckland - Searle, Ernest J.; revised by Mayhill, R.D.; Longman Paul, 1981. First published 1964. .
Volcanoes of Auckland: The Essential Guide. Hayward, B.W., Murdoch, G., Maitland, G.; Auckland University Press, 2011.
Volcanoes of Auckland: A Field Guide. Hayward, B.W.; Auckland University Press, 2019, 335 pp. .

External links
Photographs of Orakei Basin held in Auckland Libraries' heritage collections.

Auckland volcanic field
Waitematā Harbour
Ōrākei Local Board Area
Maars of New Zealand